Abba bar Pappai was a rabbi of the Land of Israel who died in 375 (fourth generation of amoraim).

As the second link in the transmission by tradition of Levi II's aggadic sayings, he is generally mentioned together with Joshua of Sikhnin, who was the first link. He addressed halakhic questions to Jose and Mani the son of Jonah, who in turn placed halakhic problems before him.

References

Talmud rabbis of the Land of Israel
Jews and Judaism in the Roman Empire
Year of birth unknown
375 deaths
4th-century rabbis
Ancient Jewish scholars